KQSO-LP, formerly licensed to operate on (96.3 FM), was a low-power radio station licensed to Newberg, Oregon, United States. However, the Federal Communications Commission (FCC) had issued a STA for the station to operate at 102.9 MHz due to the move-in of a commercial station (KWLZ-FM) licensed to West Linn, Oregon. The station signed on the air February 7, 2009, and was owned by the Western Oregon Radio Club, Inc. (WORC), an amateur radio organization.

On January 1, 2012, KQSO-LP undertook an affiliation with the WORC Oldies Network, which syndicates broadcast material to other low-power radio stations interested in amateur radio. Programming included amateur (ham) radio news, educational material, comedy, oldies, and adult standard music.

Veteran disc jockey (DJ) "The Vegetable Man", who was local to Pacific Northwest radio in the 1960s, was also broadcast by the network with periodic shows daily.

On December 25, 2014, the station signed permanently off the air due to an FM translator in Portland signing on the air on the same frequency as KQSO-LP.  Due to the translator's overpowering signal, KQSO-LP's signal was impeded. A decision was made to cease operation.  Early in 2014, the WORC applied to the FCC for another LPFM station in Portland. As such, the FCC granted the WORC a CP for KISN-LP. On May 1, 2015, KISN-LP went on the air and was subsequently licensed by the FCC. See KISN (Portland) for more details.

The WORC surrendered the license for KQSO-LP to the FCC on May 1, 2015; the license was cancelled on May 4, 2015.

External links
Western Oregon Radio Club

QSO-LP
QSO-LP
Newberg, Oregon
2009 establishments in Oregon
Radio stations established in 2009
Defunct radio stations in the United States
Radio stations disestablished in 2015
2015 disestablishments in Oregon
QSO-LP